Ski Wentworth is a Canadian alpine ski hill in Nova Scotia's Cobequid Hills.

Ski Wentworth is located in the hamlet of Wentworth in the Wentworth Valley, 48 km northwest of Truro and 67 km east of Amherst on Trunk 4.

It is the largest alpine ski facility in Nova Scotia, having a 248-metre (815 foot) vertical difference.  It features 23 alpine trails, a half-pipe, and 2 terrain parks.  The trails are varied in difficulty from beginner to expert and support both alpine skiing and snowboarding.

Trails

Wentworth also has varied glade or tree trails from intermediate to advanced. Glade trails exist over almost the entire mountain and are largely unmarked on the trail map.

Lifts

Wentworth has 2 Quad chair lifts, 1 T-bar lift and 1 Magic carpet (ski lift).

Terrain Park

The Terrain Park features many jumps, rails and boxes for all

2011 Canada Winter Games

Ski Wentworth was the main venue for the 2011 Canada Winter games in terms of Alpine and free-style Skiing. As of Summer 2009 construction was underway to enlarge the half-pipe as well as to improve the snow making equipment and re-create the moguls trail. The upgrades also featured new trails.

Other services

Wentworth has an outlet in the main lodge, offering a selection of ski and snowboard equipment, clothing and accessories. The SKIGLOO Daycare is open Weekends and Holidays from 9am to 4pm, and Friday nights 7pm to 10pm, throughout the entire season. The outlet also tunes and repairs equipment. The rental shop at Ski Wentworth features a variety of skis, boards and blades as well as boots, poles and helmets.  Ski Wentworth also has ski and snowboard lessons and is patrolled by the Canadian Ski Patrol.

References

External links
Ski Wentworth

Ski areas and resorts in Nova Scotia
Geography of Cumberland County, Nova Scotia
2011 Canada Winter Games
Tourist attractions in Cumberland County, Nova Scotia